Le Puiset is a former commune in the Eure-et-Loir department in northern France. On 1 January 2019, it was merged into the new commune Janville-en-Beauce.

Name
The name Le Puiset comes from Latin puteus, pit or cistern, whence French puits, well. It takes its name from a local spring. In medieval sources, its name is given as Puteolum, Puteacum, Pusiacum, Puisiacum or Pusatum in Latin and as Puisat or Puysiax (among others) in French. Its inhabitants were called Puteacenses.

History
In the Middle Ages it was the site of a lordship within the County of Blois and Chartres. The lords descended from the counts of Breteuil, and often also held the position of viscount of Chartres. They participated in the Norman Conquest and the crusades of the 12th century, and were cousins of the dynasty of the Kings of Jerusalem.

Population

See also
Communes of the Eure-et-Loir department

References

Statistics, in French

Former communes of Eure-et-Loir
Crusade places